Pseudocoremia lupinata is a species of moth in the family Geometridae. It is endemic to New Zealand.

References 

Boarmiini
Moths of New Zealand
Endemic fauna of New Zealand
Moths described in 1875
Taxa named by Rudolf Felder
Taxa named by Alois Friedrich Rogenhofer
Endemic moths of New Zealand